is a franchise of role-playing video games developed by the Gust Corporation since 1997, primarily for the PlayStation line of consoles (PlayStation, PlayStation 2, PlayStation 3, and PlayStation 4); portable versions for the Game Boy Color, Game Boy Advance, Nintendo DS, Nintendo 3DS, PlayStation Portable, PlayStation Vita and WonderSwan Color have also been made. Two of the games in the series were ported to the Sega Saturn and Dreamcast.

The series has been primarily released in Japan, though recent titles have been localized for other markets. The franchise centers around the concept of an atelier specialising in alchemy; the gameplay involves finding, collecting, and combining items in recipes to create better items, which allows the player to advance further in the game. A manga adaptation by Yoshihiko Ochi has also been published. As of December 2020, the series has sold more than 5 million copies.

Common elements
Alchemy is the distinguishing theme of the Atelier series.  Players control the game's character, roaming the game world to collect objects to use in alchemy recipes to create new objects, including cooking ingredients, recovery items, tools, weapons, armor, and accessories.  Synthesized objects are commonly required in order to create more powerful or potent objects through alchemy.  Many of the games feature a method of transferring properties of one item from the recipe to the synthesized item.  Recipes also often allow the substitution of items, which can either lend better properties to the final synthesized item, or can lead to the character thinking of a completely new recipe.
The games generally feature a turn-based combat system, in which the items made through alchemy come into play, either to boost the character's abilities, or for offensive, defensive, or support items.

The games' stories are typically light-hearted and humorous, often deriving conflict from a source other than an antagonist and the player ends up with a large group of characters to explore the world with. In most games of the series, the player has a limited in-game time to accomplish one or more main objectives and actions like gathering items, traveling or synthesizing spend a portion of that time. Failure to accomplish the game's main tasks in time may cause the game to end abruptly or lead to a bad end, though these time limits tend to be rather lenient. The first entry in the "Mysterious" Atelier series Atelier Sophie does away with the time limit system, but the second entry Atelier Firis has a time limit for completing the game's first story objective, after which players can play at their leisure.

Games
There have been 24 main games in the Atelier franchise which are subdivided into seven sub-series. There are three games in the Salburg series, two games in Gramnad series, three games in the Iris series, two games in the Mana-Khemia series, four games in the Arland series, three games in the Dusk series, four games in the Mysterious series, and three games in the Secret series.

Side games
In addition to the main games, several side games have been released.

Remakes and ports
Several of the series' titles were remade or ported, mostly for portable devices.

 A Gust's official spelling is Viorate, as seen on the manga adaptation's and the original soundtrack's cover.

Other
Marie from Atelier Marie: The Alchemist of Salburg, and Liliane Vehlendorf, Rozeluxe Meitzen, Whim and Rewrich Wallach from Mana Khemia 2 joins many other out of game characters in 2008's Cross Edge.
Viorate from Atelier Viorate: The Alchemist of Gramnad 2 appears in the 2009 company-collaboration RPG, Trinity Universe released in the United States by NIS America (as "Violet").
Company-collaborative 2010 RPG Hyperdimension Neptunia'''s in-game character Gust displays Atelier characters in numerous special attacks in the game. Gust also has a costume that directly resembles a costume from Atelier. She also has a hobby of making items out of strange ingredients, a play on the Atelier series' focus on alchemy. She returns for the reboot as an important story character but was later replaced by Broccoli in the remake. She also appeared in the Megami Tsuuhin manga on some chapters.
As of January 2015, Koei Tecmo's My Gamecity Card Collection browser collectible card game features more than 170 Atelier themed cards.
Astrid Zexis, Rorolina Frixell, Cordelia von Feuerbach, Lionela Heinze and Pamela Ibis, from Atelier Rorona: The Alchemist of Arland appeared in 2013's Kaku-san-sei Million Arthur.
Sterkenburg Cranach from Atelier Arland series, appeared in Warriors Orochi 3 Ultimate, sporting his Meruru appearance and his Rorona appearance as DLC costume.
2013's Dynasty Warriors 8: Xtreme Legends has a Rorolina Frixelle-themed (from Atelier Rorona) costume for playable character Wang Yuanji.
2014's Deception IV: Blood Ties has a costume based on Totooria Helmold, from Atelier Totori.Chain Chronicle's October 2015 update added Rorolina Frixell and Cordelia von Feuerbach from Atelier Rorona, Merurulince Rede Arls, Keina Swaya and Sterkenburg Cranach from Atelier Meruru, and Totooria Helmold and Mimi Houllier von Schwarzlang from Atelier Totori, as playable characters.
In 2016, costumes based from various games by Gust, including the Atelier series, appeared as DLC in Dead or Alive 5 Last Round.
In 2017, Sophie Neuenmuller and  Plachta appeared in Warriors All-Stars as playable characters.
In 2017, costumes based on Rorolina Frixell and Hom from Atelier Rorona appeared as DLC in Gust's game Blue Reflection.
In 2018, costumes of Lydie and Suelle Malen appeared in Everybody's Golf as part of a collaboration. In return, costumes based on the game appear for free for an entire year exclusive to the PlayStation 4 version of Atelier Lydie & Suelle: The Alchemists and the Mysterious Paintings.
Various Atelier costumes return as DLC in Dead or Alive 6 as part of the "Gust Mashup Costume Set". A separate DLC pack was released titled "Atelier Ryza Mashup Set" that is based on the three female playable characters in Atelier Ryza: Ever Darkness & the Secret Hideout.

 Anime and manga adaptations 

 by Yoshihiko Ochi is a five volume manga adaptation first published in Japan by Enterbrain, published in German by Egmont, published in French by Ki-oon, and four of the volumes were published in English by Tokyopop. The series was later re-edited and re-released in two tankōbon volumes on July 25, 2007. The manga later received a sequel titled , as of February 2018 Enterbrain released eight tankōbon volumes. In 2005 Enterbrain also released a one-shot manga titled .Atelier Escha & Logy: Alchemists of the Dusk Sky was adapted into a manga series by Chako Abeno. It features some arrangements to the story in order to let supporting characters play a bigger role.  As of January 2015 two tankōbon volumes was released.  It has also been adapted into a 12-episode television anime series, produced by Studio Gokumi and directed by Yoshiaki Iwasaki, aired on Tokyo MX between April 10, 2014 and 26 June 2014.

A manga adaptation of Atelier Ryza: Ever Darkness & the Secret Hideout, written and illustrated by Riichu started serialization in Shūkan Famitsū on September 17, 2020.

A manga adaptation of Atelier Rorona also exists.

An anime television series adaptation of Atelier Ryza: Ever Darkness & the Secret Hideout was announced on March 19, 2023. It will be animated by Liden Films and directed by Ema Yuzuhira, with Yashichiro Takahashi and Kazuki Yanagawa reprising their roles from the game as script writer and composer.

See also
 Quintet (company)
 List of Japanese role-playing game franchises
 Chronos Materia''

Notes

References

External links
 Arland Portal 
 

 
Koei Tecmo franchises
Role-playing video games by series
Video game franchises
Video game franchises introduced in 1997
Video games about alchemy